Loch Dubh ("Black Loch") is a lochan on the Duchray Water in the western part of Loch Ard Forest in the Central Highlands of Scotland.

Location 
Loch Dubh nestles in a wooded valley called Gleann Dubh at a height of about 140 metres above sea level. It is 4 kilometres east of Scotland's most popular Munro, Ben Lomond (974 m), one kilometre south of Beinn Dubh (508 m), 1½ kilometres northeast of Beinn Bahn (569 m) and five kilometres west northwest of Kinlochard near the head of Loch Ard.

References 

Ard
Dubh
Forth basin
Trossachs